In linguistics, and particularly phonology, stress or accent is the relative emphasis or prominence given to a certain syllable in a word or to a certain word in a phrase or sentence. That emphasis is typically caused by such properties as increased loudness and vowel length, full articulation of the vowel, and changes in tone. The terms stress and accent are often used synonymously in that context but are sometimes distinguished. For example, when emphasis is produced through pitch alone, it is called pitch accent, and when produced through length alone, it is called quantitative accent. When caused by a combination of various intensified properties, it is called stress accent or dynamic accent; English uses what is called variable stress accent.

Since stress can be realised through a wide range of phonetic properties, such as loudness, vowel length, and pitch (which are also used for other linguistic functions), it is difficult to define stress solely phonetically.

The stress placed on syllables within words is called word stress. Some languages have fixed stress, meaning that the stress on virtually any multisyllable word falls on a particular syllable, such as the penultimate (e.g. Polish) or the first (e.g. Finnish). Other languages, like English and Russian, have lexical stress, where the position of stress in a word is not predictable in that way but lexically encoded. Sometimes more than one level of stress, such as primary stress and secondary stress, may be identified.

Stress is not necessarily a feature of all languages: some, such as French and Mandarin, are sometimes analyzed as lacking lexical stress entirely.

The stress placed on words within sentences is called sentence stress or prosodic stress. That is one of the three components of prosody, along with rhythm and intonation. It includes phrasal stress (the default emphasis of certain words within phrases or clauses), and contrastive stress (used to highlight an item, a word or part of a word, that is given particular focus).

Phonetic realization 
There are various ways in which stress manifests itself in the speech stream, and they depend to some extent on which language is being spoken. Stressed syllables are often louder than non-stressed syllables, and they may have a higher or lower pitch. They may also sometimes be pronounced longer. There are sometimes differences in place or manner of articulation. In particular, vowels in unstressed syllables may have a more central (or "neutral") articulation, and those in stressed syllables have a more peripheral articulation. Stress may be realized to varying degrees on different words in a sentence; sometimes, the difference is minimal between the acoustic signals of stressed and those of unstressed syllables.

Those particular distinguishing features of stress, or types of prominence in which particular features are dominant, are sometimes referred to as particular types of accent: dynamic accent in the case of loudness, pitch accent in the case of pitch (although that term usually has more specialized meanings), quantitative accent in the case of length, and qualitative accent in the case of differences in articulation. They can be compared to the various types of accent in music theory. In some contexts, the term stress or stress accent specifically means dynamic accent (or as an antonym to pitch accent in its various meanings).

A prominent syllable or word is said to be accented or tonic; the latter term does not imply that it carries phonemic tone. Other syllables or words are said to be unaccented or atonic. Syllables are frequently said to be in pretonic or post-tonic position, and certain phonological rules apply specifically to such positions. For instance, in American English, /t/ and /d/ are flapped in post-tonic position.

In Mandarin Chinese, which is a tonal language, stressed syllables have been found to have tones that are realized with a relatively large swing in fundamental frequency, and unstressed syllables typically have smaller swings. (See also Stress in Standard Chinese.)

Stressed syllables are often perceived as being more forceful than non-stressed syllables.

Word stress 
Word stress, or sometimes lexical stress, is the stress placed on a given syllable in a word. The position of word stress in a word may depend on certain general rules applicable in the language or dialect in question, but in other languages, it must be learned for each word, as it is largely unpredictable.  In some cases, classes of words in a language differ in their stress properties; for example, loanwords into a language with fixed stress may preserve stress placement from the source language, or the special pattern for Turkish placenames.

Non-phonemic stress
In some languages, the placement of stress can be determined by rules. It is thus not a phonemic property of the word, because it can always be predicted by applying the rules.

Languages in which the position of the stress can usually be predicted by a simple rule are said to have fixed stress. For example, in Czech, Finnish, Icelandic and Hungarian, the stress almost always comes on the first syllable of a word. In Armenian the stress is on the last syllable of a word. In Quechua, Esperanto, and Polish, the stress is almost always on the penult (second-last syllable). In Macedonian, it is on the antepenult (third-last syllable).

Other languages have stress placed on different syllables but in a predictable way, as in Classical Arabic and Latin, where stress is conditioned by the structure of particular syllables. They are said to have a regular stress rule.

Statements about the position of stress are sometimes affected by the fact that when a word is spoken in isolation, prosodic factors (see below) come into play, which do not apply when the word is spoken normally within a sentence. French words are sometimes said to be stressed on the final syllable, but that can be attributed to the prosodic stress that is placed on the last syllable (unless it is a schwa, when stress is placed on the second-last syllable) of any string of words in that language. Thus, it is on the last syllable of a word analyzed in isolation. The situation is similar in Standard Chinese. French (some authors add Chinese) can be considered to have no real lexical stress.

Phonemic stress
Languages such as English, Russian, Italian, Portuguese and Spanish, in which the position of stress in a word is not fully predictable, are said to have phonemic stress. Stress in these languages is usually truly lexical and must be memorized as part of the pronunciation of an individual word. Sometimes, stress is fixed for all forms of a particular word, or it can fall on different syllables in different inflections of the same word.

In such languages with phonemic stress, the position of stress can serve to distinguish otherwise identical words. For example, the English words insight and incite are distinguished in pronunciation only by the fact that the stress falls on the first syllable in the former and on the second syllable in the latter. Examples from other languages include German  ( "gist of message" vs.  "tenor voice"); and Italian  ( "anchor" vs.  "more, still, yet, again").

In many languages with lexical stress, it is connected with alternations in vowels and/or consonants, which means that vowel quality differs by whether vowels are stressed or unstressed. There may also be limitations on certain phonemes in the language in which stress determines whether they are allowed to occur in a particular syllable or not.

Dialects of the same language may have different stress placement. For instance, the English word laboratory is stressed on the second syllable in British English (labóratory often pronounced "labóratry", the second o being silent), but the first syllable in American English, with a secondary stress on the "tor' syllable (láboratory often pronounced "lábratory"). The Spanish word  is stressed on the first syllable in Spain but on the second syllable in the Americas. The Portuguese words for Madagascar and the continent Oceania are stressed on the third syllable in European Portuguese ( and ), but on the fourth syllable in Brazilian Portuguese ( and ).

Compounds
With very few exceptions, English compound words are stressed on their first component. Even the exceptions, such as mankínd, are instead often stressed on the first component by some people or in some kinds of English. The same components as those of a compound word are sometimes used in a descriptive phrase with a different meaning and with stress on both words, but that descriptive phrase is then not usually considered a compound: bláck bírd (any bird that is black) and bláckbird (a specific bird species) and páper bág (a bag made of paper) and páper bag (very rarely used for a bag for carrying newspapers but is often also used for a bag made of paper).

Levels of stress 

Some languages are described as having both primary stress and secondary stress. A syllable with secondary stress is stressed relative to unstressed syllables but not as strongly as a syllable with primary stress. As with primary stress, the position of secondary stress may be more or less predictable depending on language. In English, it is not fully predictable, but the different secondary stress of the words organization and accumulation (on the first and second syllable, respectively) is predictable due to the same stress of the verbs órganize and accúmulate. In some analyses, for example the one found in Chomsky and Halle's The Sound Pattern of English, English has been described as having four levels of stress: primary, secondary, tertiary, and quaternary, but the treatments often disagree with one another. 

Peter Ladefoged and other phoneticians have noted that it is possible to describe English with only one degree of stress, as long as prosody is recognized and unstressed syllables are phonemically distinguished for vowel reduction. They find that the multiple levels posited for English, whether primary–secondary or primary–secondary–tertiary, are not phonetic stress (let alone phonemic), and that the supposed secondary/tertiary stress is not characterized by the increase in respiratory activity associated with primary/secondary stress in English and other languages. (For further detail see Stress and vowel reduction in English.)

Prosodic stress 

Prosodic stress, or sentence stress, refers to stress patterns that apply at a higher level than the individual word – namely within a prosodic unit. It may involve a certain natural stress pattern characteristic of a given language, but may also involve the placing of emphasis on particular words because of their relative importance (contrastive stress).

An example of a natural prosodic stress pattern is that described for French above; stress is placed on the final syllable of a string of words (or if that is a schwa, the next-to-final syllable). (A word spoken alone becomes such a phrase, hence such prosodic stress may appear to be lexical if the pronunciation of words is analyzed in a standalone context rather than within phrases.)

Another type of prosodic stress pattern is quantity sensitivity – in some languages additional stress tends to be placed on syllables that are longer (moraically heavy).

Prosodic stress is also often used pragmatically to emphasize (focus attention on) particular words or the ideas associated with them. Doing this can change or clarify the meaning of a sentence; for example:

As in the examples above, stress is normally transcribed as italics in printed text or underlining in handwriting.

In English, stress is most dramatically realized on focused or accented words. For instance, consider the dialogue

In it, the stress-related acoustic differences between the syllables of "tomorrow" would be small compared to the differences between the syllables of "dinner", the emphasized word. In these emphasized words, stressed syllables such as "din" in "dinner" are louder and longer. They may also have a different fundamental frequency, or other properties.

The main stress within a sentence, often found on the last stressed word, is called the nuclear stress.

Stress and vowel reduction 
In many languages, such as Russian and English, vowel reduction may occur when a vowel changes from a stressed to an unstressed position. In English, unstressed vowels may reduce to schwa-like vowels, though the details vary with dialect (see stress and vowel reduction in English). The effect may be dependent on lexical stress (for example, the unstressed first syllable of the word photographer contains a schwa , whereas the stressed first syllable of photograph does not ), or on prosodic stress (for example, the word of is pronounced with a schwa when it is unstressed within a sentence, but not when it is stressed).

Many other languages, such as Finnish and the mainstream dialects of Spanish, do not have unstressed vowel reduction; in these languages vowels in unstressed syllables have nearly the same quality as those in stressed syllables.

Stress and rhythm 
Some languages, such as English, are said to be stress-timed languages; that is, stressed syllables appear at a roughly constant rate and non-stressed syllables are shortened to accommodate that, which contrasts with languages that have syllable timing (e.g. Spanish) or mora timing (e.g. Japanese), whose syllables or moras are spoken at a roughly constant rate regardless of stress. For details, see isochrony.

Historical effects 
It is common for stressed and unstressed syllables to behave differently as a language evolves. For example, in the Romance languages, the original Latin short vowels  and  have often become diphthongs when stressed. Since stress takes part in verb conjugation, that has produced verbs with vowel alternation in the Romance languages. For example, the Spanish verb  (to return, come back) has the form  in the past tense but  in the present tense (see Spanish irregular verbs). Italian shows the same phenomenon but with  alternating with  instead. That behavior is not confined to verbs; note for example Spanish  "wind" from Latin , or Italian  "fire" from Latin .

Stress "deafness" 
An operational definition of word stress may be provided by the stress "deafness" paradigm. The idea is that if listeners perform poorly on reproducing the presentation order of series of stimuli that minimally differ in the position of phonetic prominence (e.g. [númi]/[numí]), the language does not have word stress. The task involves a reproduction of the order of stimuli as a sequence of key strokes, whereby key "1" is associated with one stress location (e.g. [númi]) and key "2" with the other (e.g. [numí]). A trial may be from 2 to 6 stimuli in length. Thus, the order [númi-númi-numí-númi] is to be reproduced as "1121". It was found that listeners whose native language was French performed significantly worse than Spanish listeners in reproducing the stress patterns by key strokes.

An important case of stress "deafness" relates to Persian. The language has generally been described as having contrastive word stress or accent as evidenced by numerous stem and stem-clitic minimal pairs such as /mɒhi/ [mɒ.hí] ("fish") and /mɒh-i/ [mɒ́.hi] ("some month"). The authors argue that the reason that Persian listeners are stress "deaf" is that their accent locations arise postlexically. Persian thus lacks stress in the strict sense.

Stress "deafness" has been studied for a number of languages, such as Polish or French learners of Spanish.

Spelling and notation for stress 
The orthographies of some languages include devices for indicating the position of lexical stress. Some examples are listed below:
 In Modern Greek, all polysyllables are written with an acute accent over the vowel of the stressed syllable.
 In Spanish orthography, stress may be written explicitly with a single acute accent on a vowel. That is, if a word is written without an accent mark, the stress is on the penult if the last letter is a vowel, n, or s, but on the final syllable if the word ends in any other letter. However, as in Greek, the acute accent is also used for some words to distinguish various syntactical uses (e.g. 'tea' vs.  a form of the pronoun  'you';  'where' as a pronoun or wh-complement,  'where' as an adverb). 
 In Portuguese, stress is sometimes indicated explicitly with an acute accent (for i, u, and open a, e, o), or circumflex (for close a, e, o). The orthography has an extensive set of rules that describe the placement of diacritics, based on the position of the stressed syllable and the surrounding letters.
 In Italian, the grave accent is needed in words ending with an accented vowel, e.g. (In this particular case, a frequent one in which diacritics present themselves, the difference of accents is caused by the fall of the second "i" from Latin in Italian, typical of the genitive, in the first noun (con/domìnìi/, meaning "of the owner"); while the second was derived from the nominative (con/dòmini/, meaning simply "owners").

Though not part of normal orthography, a number of devices exist that are used by linguists and others to indicate the position of stress (and syllabification in some cases) when it is desirable to do so. Some of these are listed here.
 Most commonly, the stress mark is placed before the beginning of the stressed syllable, where a syllable is definable. However, it is occasionally placed immediately before the vowel. In the International Phonetic Alphabet (IPA), primary stress is indicated by a high vertical line before the stressed element, secondary stress by a low vertical line. Extra stress can be indicated by doubling the symbol: .
 Linguists frequently mark primary stress with an acute accent over the vowel, and secondary stress by a grave accent. That has the advantage of not requiring a decision about syllable boundaries.
 In English dictionaries that show pronunciation by respelling, stress is typically marked with a prime mark placed after the stressed syllable: /si-lab′-ə-fi-kay′-shən/.
 In  pronunciation guides, stress is often indicated using a combination of bold text and capital letters. For example, si-lab-if-i-KAY-shun or si-LAB-if-i-KAY-shun
 In Russian, Belarusian, and Ukrainian dictionaries, stress is indicated with marks called  ('stress marks'). Primary stress is indicated with an acute accent (´) on a syllable's vowel. Secondary stress may be unmarked or marked with a grave accent: . If the acute accent sign is unavailable for technical reasons, stress can be marked by making the vowel capitalized or italic. In general texts, stress marks are rare, typically used either when required for disambiguation of homographs (compare  'in great quantities', and  'in great quantities'), or in rare words and names that are likely to be mispronounced. Materials for foreign learners may have stress marks throughout the text.
 In Dutch,  indication of stress is usually marked by an acute accent on the vowel (or, in the case of a diphthong or double vowel, the first two vowels) of the stressed syllable.
 In Biblical Hebrew, a complex system of cantillation marks is used to mark stress, as well as verse syntax and the melody according to which the verse is chanted in ceremonial Bible reading. In Modern Hebrew, there is no standardized way to mark the stress. That mark is usually used in books by the Academy of the Hebrew Language and is available on the standard Hebrew keyboard at AltGr-6.

See also 
 Accent (poetry)
 Accent (music)
 Foot (prosody)
 Initial-stress-derived noun
 Pitch accent (intonation)
 Rhythm
 Syllable weight

References

External links 
 "Feet and Metrical Stress", The Cambridge Handbook of Phonology
 "Word stress in English: Six Basic Rules", Linguapress
 Word Stress Rules: A Guide to Word and Sentence Stress Rules for English Learners and Teachers,  based on affixation

 
Phonetics
Phonology
Poetic rhythm